Liana, or Liana-Seti, is a language of Seram, Indonesia.  It also goes by the names Kobi and Uhei Kachlakan, names it shares with neighboring Benggoi.

External links

Central Maluku languages
Languages of Indonesia
Seram Island